Comănești is a town in Bacău County, Romania.

Comăneşti may also refer to several places in Romania:

 Comănești, Suceava, a commune in Suceava County
 Comăneşti, a village in Hășmaș Commune, Arad County
 Comăneşti, a village in Cavadinești Commune, Galaţi County
 Comăneşti, a village in Mărtiniș Commune, Harghita County
 Comăneşti, a village in Bala Commune, Mehedinţi County
 Comăneşti, a village in Bobicești Commune, Olt County

See also 
 Coman (disambiguation)
 Comana (disambiguation)
 Comanca (disambiguation)